The 2019 Inter-District Championship (IDC) is the 81st season of Inter-District Championship. It is the last championship of the 2019 Fijian football season. The 2019 IDC started on 8 October and is sponsored by Courts.

Squads 
Each team is allowed to register a 22-man squad

Teams 
The eight teams from 2019 Vodafone Premier League play 2019 IDC Premier Division

Participants

Group stage 
The 8 Vodafone Premier League teams were split in two groups with four teams each.

Group A

Results

Group B

Results

Semi-finals

Final

Awards 

 Golden Boot - Christopher Wasasala (Suva)
 Golden Ball - Atonio Tuivuna (Labasa)
 Fair Play Team - Suva
 New Find - Melvin Reddy (Labasa)

 Semi-finals MVP - Gagame Feni (Suva)
 Final MVP - Dennis Ifunaoa (Labasa)

See also 
 2019 Vodafone Senior League
 2019 Fiji Premier League
 2019 Inter-District Championship - Senior Division
 2019 Fiji Battle of the Giants
 2019 Fiji Football Association Cup Tournament

References

External links

Fiji Inter-District Championship
2019 in Fijian football